Pu Zhelong (1912–1997) was a Chinese entomologist and an academician of the Chinese Academy of Sciences.

Biography
Born in Yunnan, Pu's family was originally from Qinzhou, Guangxi. He graduated from Sun Yat-sen University College of Agriculture in 1935, earned his PhD at the University of Minnesota in 1949. He became Professor and Dean of Life Sciences at  Sun Yat-sen University. He was elected an academician of the Chinese Academy of Sciences in 1980.

Pu is also known for his work of bringing together international (yang 洋， "foreign") scientific knowledge and Chinese (tu 土， "local") knowledge, thus playing an important, and exemplary role, in the history of science in the context of Chinese political history.

"Pu’s work also reflects the emphasis on nationalist self-reliance produced by economic constraints, China's odd position in Cold War geopolitics, and Maoist ideology. Although postsocialist biographies of Pu highlight his professional (yang) achievements and downplay his contributions to the self-reliance, mass mobilization, and nativism embodied in tu science, Pu's experience demonstrates that tu science could be a natural fit for agricultural scientists. At the same time, Pu skillfully navigated the tensions of the Cold War to serve as an effective agent of China's new form of transnationalism in the 1970s. China's renewal of relations with the United States did not result immediately in the rise of a more yang vision for science. Rather, Pu and others first mobilized their yang connections to promote the idea of a uniquely socialist Chinese tu science that China could offer to the world."

Further reading
 "Pu Zhelong: Making Socialist Science Work", chapter 2 in Sigrid Schmalzer, "Red Revolution, Green Revolution": Scientific Farming in Socialist China (University of Chicago Press, 2016. )
 Moth and Wasp, Soil and Ocean - Remembering Chinese Scientist Pu Zhelong's Work for Sustainable Farming, by Sigrid Schmalzer, illustrated by Melanie Linden Chan (Tilbury Books, 2018. )

References

1912 births
1997 deaths
Biologists from Yunnan
Chinese entomologists
Chinese expatriates in the United States
Members of the Chinese Academy of Sciences
Sun Yat-sen University alumni
Academic staff of Sun Yat-sen University
University of Minnesota alumni
20th-century Chinese zoologists